General elections were held in the Cook Islands on 30 March 1978 to elect members of the Legislative Assembly. The result was a victory for the Cook Islands Party (CIP) of Premier Albert Henry, which won 15 of the 22 seats. The Democratic Party won the remaining seven seats.

Following the elections, the Democratic Party challenged the results, claiming Henry had used public funds to subsidise flights that brought expatriate CIP supporters back to the Cook Islands to vote, which cost around $300,000. The election of nine CIP MPs was subsequently overturned by an electoral court, allowing Democratic Party leader Tom Davis – who had lost his seat before being reinstated as a result of the ruling – to become Premier. Henry was subsequently convicted of conspiracy and misuse of public money, and later stripped of his knighthood.

Background
Elections were called six months early by Henry, hoping to capitalise on divisions in the Democratic Party during a leadership challenge. Prior to the elections, three prominent CIP members, William Estall, Raui Pokoati and Joe Williams, left the party. Williams subsequently established the Unity Party.

As overseas voting was not possible, Cook Islanders had to return to the islands to vote. Special polling stations were set up at Rarotonga International Airport. Both the CIP and the Democratic Party persuaded supporters to fly from New Zealand, with six planeloads of CIP supporters travelling at a subsidised cost of $20 each, and two planeloads of Democratic Party supporters, who paid the full fare. Around 800 supporters of the CIP were transported on Ansett planes, with Democratic Party supporters travelling by Air Nauru.

Results

Aftermath
Immediately after the elections, the electoral law was amended to prevent Cook Islanders living overseas from voting, with a requirement to have been resident for three months prior to election day introduced.

The results of the three Rarotonga constituencies were challenged by the Democratic Party. The petitions were heard in an electoral court presided over by Chief Justice Gaven Donne, which sat in Auckland, Rarotonga and Wellington in May and June. It was revealed that Henry had paid $290,000 for the flights for CIP supporters back to the Cook Islands to vote using a specially founded government company.

The votes cast by the CIP voters who flew in were annulled, resulting in eight of the CIP MLAs elected in Rarotonga losing their seats and being replaced by the losing Democratic Party candidates including Tom Davis. The result in Mitiaro, where David Tetava of the CIP was elected, was also overturned due to corrupt practices and a by-election ordered.

With the Democratic Party now holding a 15–6 majority in the Legislative Assembly, Davis formed a new government. He retained the portfolios of Finance and Economic Development for himself, and appointed Pupuke Robati as Deputy Premier and Minister of Health, Vincent Ingram as Minister of Justice and Police, Papamama Pokino as Minister for Supportive Services, Iaveta Short as Minister of Agriculture and Tourism, Tangata Simoiona as Minister of Education and Tangaroa Tangaroa as Minister of Internal Affairs. Titi Tetava Ariki won the subsequent by-election in Mitiaro.

References

Elections in the Cook Islands
General election
Cook Islands
Cook Islands
Election and referendum articles with incomplete results